Schleife is a municipality of 3,000 in northern Görlitz district, northeast Saxony, Germany. It is the seat of the Verwaltungsgemeinschaft Schleife (about 5,000 inhabitants).

The municipality is part of the recognized Sorbian settlement area in Saxony. Upper Sorbian has an official status next to German, all villages bear names in both languages.

Administration 
During the 1990s there were municipal reforms in Saxony to make the administration more effective and less expensive. In that time Schleife was joined by the two villages of Mulkwitz and Rohne, and the Verwaltungsgemeinschaft Schleife, based on the parish of Schleife, was established.

The parish of Schleife consists of eight villages, except for Lieskau the Verwaltungsgemeinschaft Schleife is formed by them:

Lieskau is a special case, it is located in the state of Brandenburg. Since 2003 it belongs to the town of Spremberg.

Sorbian culture 

Schleife lies within the Sorbian habitat and marks the centre of the smallest dialect of Uppersorbian language, the Schleifer dialect (Schleifer Dialekt). It is used in Schleife and the surrounding seven villages of the parish of Schleife (Schleifer Kirchspiel). Today it is only used by a small fraction of its inhabitants but there are efforts to reestablish it as a second mother tongue. The language is taught in one of the kindergartens (Witaj project) and in local school.

Old Slavic traditions and festivals are celebrated - by individuals and by groups and organizations like the Sorbisches Folkloreensemble Schleife.

In the municipality there is a museum of the Sorbs.

Notable Natives 
 Kito Lorenc: Sorbian-German writer, lyric poet and translator.

References

External links 
 Official website (German)
 Website of the "Sorbisches Folkloreensemble Schleife" (German)

Populated places in Görlitz (district)